TS Lombard, formerly known as Lombard Street Research, is a macroeconomic forecasting consultancy with headquarters in London and offices in New York and Hong Kong. It provides research and advisory services to a global network of influential investors including asset managers, hedge funds, pension funds, central banks, private equity funds, investment banks and corporations.

History
The company was founded as LSR in 1989 by Tim Congdon, a British economist specialising in the monetarist approach to macroeconomic policy. He was soon joined by Brian Reading. Charles Dumas joined the firm in 1998, to take over the international forecasting service, and became chief economist in 2005.

Since 1989, TS Lombard has stated that its aim is to provide global investors with independent, provocative economic analysis and investment advice that challenges the consensus.

TS Lombard's forecasting methodology combines Keynesian and monetary economics. It uses analysis of money supply, sector financial balances and flow of funds in its forecasting methodology. In 2005, TS Lombard was among the few forecasters to predict the global financial crisis.

The company was acquired by TSL Research Group in 2016.

Services
TS Lombard investment research coverage includes the United States, China, Eurozone, the United Kingdom, Japan and South Korea. It also offers weekly webinars for its clients and speaking engagements.

References

1989 establishments in the United Kingdom
Macroeconomic forecasting
Companies based in the City of London